Laurel Hausler is a contemporary oil painter and sculptor. Her work has been widely critiqued and her style compared to those of Joseph Cornell, Frida Kahlo, Edward Gorey and Francis Bacon. Her paintings reflect a woman's experience in a darkly humorous and chaotic world.  Hausler worked a number of different jobs before she became a professional artist. These positions included: journalist, zookeeper and tarot card reader.

Born in Fairfax, Virginia in 1977, Hausler began to paint seriously only after living in New Orleans in the late 1990s. Her works are atmospheric, mysterious and narrative, relying heavily on imagery built upon her Catholic childhood, psychology and literature.

Influenced by the limits imposed in Catholic school and a general love of history, Hausler has developed her signature style by combining collage, found objects, drawing and painting. Though Hausler studied Literature at Gettysburg College, she declined academic artistic study and developed her own method of applying oil paint in many ghostly layers.

The artist follows a thread of expression begun by the Symbolists and continued by Expressionists such as Edvard Munch.

Hausler shows with galleries and museums across the United States, including Gallery in the Woods, located in Brattleboro, VT, and Morton Fine Art, located in the District of Columbia.

Writes curator Carol Lukitsch, 
[Laurel's] unsettling...characters from history and literature/self portraits appear to be simultaneously forming and dissolving.

Collaborations 
Hausler's painting, "The Prairie at Night" makes the cover of musician Sarah White's album "Sweetheart".

Hausler's brother is a director and she makes a brief appearance in his film, "Kalamity", starring Nick Stahl and Jonathan Jackson.

References

Sources

The Dcist "Dogs and Witches"
Vermont Observer: Dancing in the Dark
National Museum of Women in the Arts:Notable female artist database
laurelhausler.com
DCist: Attainable Art: December 3, 2007 By Lynne Venart
Streetlight Magazine
The Washington Post: Girls' Day Out, March 15, 2007
Gallery in the Woods
Arlington Arts Center. Exhibition, "Hope & Fear" December 2007 Curator/Writer: Carol Lukitsch

20th-century American painters
21st-century American painters
1977 births
Living people
20th-century American sculptors
American women painters
20th-century American women artists
21st-century American women artists